The 1960 Washington Senators won 73 games, lost 81, and finished in fifth place in the American League. They were managed by Cookie Lavagetto and played home games at Griffith Stadium, where they drew 743,404 fans in 1960, last in the eight-team league but an increase of almost 25 percent over 1959. This was the "original" Senators' 60th and final season in Washington, as they moved to Minnesota and became the Twins in 1961, which they have been named ever since. Griffith Stadium was demolished after the second Washington Senators franchise played its inaugural season there.

Regular season

Season standings

Record vs. opponents

Notable transactions

Relocation to Minnesota 
After an early flirtation with San Francisco, by 1957 Calvin Griffith was courting Minneapolis-St. Paul, a prolonged process that resulted in him rejecting the Twin Cities' first offer before agreeing to relocate. The American League opposed the move at first, but in 1960 a deal was reached: The Senators would move and would be replaced with an expansion Senators team for 1961. The old Washington Senators became the Minnesota Twins.

Roster

Player stats

Batting

Starters by position 
Note: Pos = Position; G = Games played; AB = At bats; H = Hits; Avg. = Batting average; HR = Home runs; RBI = Runs batted in

Other batters 
Note: G = Games played; AB = At bats; H = Hits; Avg. = Batting average; HR = Home runs; RBI = Runs batted in

Pitching

Starting pitchers 
Note: G = Games pitched; IP = Innings pitched; W = Wins; L = Losses; ERA = Earned run average; SO = Strikeouts

Other pitchers 
Note: G = Games pitched; IP = Innings pitched; W = Wins; L = Losses; ERA = Earned run average; SO = Strikeouts

Relief pitchers 
Note: G = Games pitched; W = Wins; L = Losses; SV = Saves; ERA = Earned run average; SO = Strikeouts

Farm system 

LEAGUE CHAMPIONS: Wytheville

Notes

References 
1960 Washington Senators at Baseball-Reference
1960 Washington Senators team page at www.baseball-almanac.com

Minnesota Twins seasons
Washington Senators season
1960 in sports in Washington, D.C.